What Do You Want from Live is the debut live album released by The Tubes, and was recorded at the Hammersmith Odeon, London.

Background 
The Tubes toured the UK at the height of the punk rock era in 1977. Despite their somewhat out-of-step musicality, the band's humorous and manic stage show found favor all over the country. The cabaret-like shows lasted over an hour, ending with Waybill – in character as "Quay Lewd", a parody of a drug-addled rock star – getting crushed to death by a giant stack of (fake) speakers. NME pronounced the tour a great success, writing: "They came, they outraged, they conquered."

Track listing
"Overture" - 6:39
"Up from the Deep" – 2:00
"Young and Rich" – 1:27
"Madam I'm Adam" – 0:49
"Mondo Bondage" – 0:12
"Up from the Deep" – 1:00
"White Punks on Dope" – 0:20
"Got Yourself a Deal" – 4:30
"Show Me a Reason" – 3:28
"What Do You Want from Life" – 5:12
"God-Bird-Change" – 4:48
"Special Ballet" – 1:01
"Don't Touch Me There" – 3:48
"Mondo Bondage" – 3:25
"Smoke (La vie en Fumér)" – 8:20
"Crime Medley" - 3:05
"Sound Effect-Siren" – 0:08
Theme from "Dragnet" – 0:07
Theme from "Peter Gunn" – 0:34
Theme from "Perry Mason" – 1:13
Theme from "Untouchables" – 1:03
"I Was a Punk Before You Were a Punk" – 4:02
"I Saw Her Standing There" (John Lennon, Paul McCartney) – 2:57
"Drum Solo" – 4:20
"Boy Crazy" – 2:40
"You're No Fun" – 3:15
"Stand Up and Shout" – 3:30
"White Punks on Dope" – 8:33

Personnel
Fee Waybill - vocals
Bill Spooner - guitar, vocals
Michael Cotten - synthesizer
Mingo Lewis - drums, percussion
Prairie Prince - drums
Roger Steen - guitar
Vince Welnick - keyboards
Rick Anderson - bass
Re Styles - vocals

Critical reception 
Although AllMusic reviews the album very favorably, describing it as "witty and entertaining" throughout, it ultimately gives it three stars out of five because the audio portion of the show is simply unable to convey the full impact of a Tubes concert in their heyday. "The downside of What Do You Want from Live", says reviewer Donald A. Guarisco, "is that some of the numbers are less potent without the choreographed routines surrounding them... this leaves the listener feeling like they're only witnessing part of the joke", adding wistfully, "if only someone would put out a video of one of the Tubes' shows from this era."

Charts

References

The Tubes albums
1978 live albums
A&M Records live albums
Albums recorded at the Hammersmith Apollo